Nārang or Narang may refer to:

Places
Narang Mandi, a city in the Muridke Tehsil of Seikhupura District, Punjab, Pakistan
Narang railway station
Nārag, or Nārang, a town of Chakwal District, in the Punjab province of Pakistan
Narang Gewog, a gewog (village block) of Mongar District, Bhutan

People

Given name
Narang Pornsiriporn (born 2001), Thai swimmer

Surname
Ankit Narang (born 1989), Indian television actor
Arun Narang, Indian politician from Punjab
Gagan Narang (born 1983), Indian sport shooter
Gopi Chand Narang (1931–2022), Indian theorist, literary critic, and scholar
Kirpal Singh Narang (1912–2019), Indian historian and educator
Prineha Narang (born 1989), American scientist and quantum engineer
Pulkit Narang (born 1994), Indian cricketer
Shammi Narang (born 1956) Indian voice-over artist, news anchor, and entrepreneur
Shivin Narang, Indian television actor
Vipin Narang, American political scientist and federal official